Sir Maurice Hugh Lowthian Bell, 3rd Baronet,  (29 March 1871 – 17 November 1944) was a British soldier.

Early life
Bell was the son of Sir Hugh Bell, 2nd Baronet and his wife Mary (née Shield).  His older sister was Gertrude Bell.  He was educated at Eton and in Paris and Germany.

Career
His business interests included being director of Dorman Long and Horden Collieries.

He joined the British Army after Sandhurst in 1890 and was commissioned as second lieutenant. He was an officer in the 5th (Volunteer) Battalion, the Yorkshire Regiment. He saw active service in South Africa in 1900 when he volunteered to serve in a company attached to a regular battalion during the Second Boer War. Leaving Southampton for Cape Town in February 1900, he returned later the same year. He went to Flanders in 1915 as commanding officer of the 4th Bn Green Howards during the First World War, and was mentioned in dispatches twice.  He was invalided home and awarded the CMG in 1916.

For the remainder he was granted a command in England. He was High Sheriff of Durham in 1921. He succeeded his father as 3rd Baronet in 1931. He resided at Mount Grace Priory, Northallerton. Upon his death he was succeeded as Baronet by his nephew, Sir Hugh Bell, 4th Baronet(1923-1970).

References

Bibliography
 
 

1871 births
1944 deaths
Companions of the Order of St Michael and St George
People educated at Eton College
Deputy Lieutenants of the North Riding of Yorkshire
High Sheriffs of Durham
English justices of the peace
Baronets in the Baronetage of the United Kingdom
British Army personnel of World War I
Place of death missing
Green Howards officers
Yorkshire Regiment officers